Augusto Mainguyague (born September 10, 1985) is an Argentine football defender who plays for Central Córdoba de Santiago del Estero.

Career
Mainguyague joined Newell's when he was 14 years old, and worked his way up to the first team. He made his flight top debut on February 25, 2007, in a loss to Lanús.

In 2008, he was transferred on loan to Club Bolívar from the Liga de Fútbol Profesional Boliviano. Playing for Bolívar, Mainguyague won the pre-season Aerosur Cup, as well as the 2009 Apertura tournament.

In January 2010 he joined Instituto of the Argentine 2nd division.

In 2012 arrived to Central Córdoba de Santiago del Estero of the Argentine 3rd division.

Club titles

References

External links
 
 
 

1985 births
Living people
Sportspeople from Córdoba Province, Argentina
Argentine footballers
Association football defenders
Newell's Old Boys footballers
Instituto footballers
Club Bolívar players
Independiente Rivadavia footballers
Argentine Primera División players
Expatriate footballers in Bolivia
Argentine expatriate footballers
Argentine expatriate sportspeople in Bolivia